St. Paul's-Outside-the-Walls may refer to:
 the Territorial abbacy of San Paolo fuori le Mura
 the Basilica of Saint Paul Outside the Walls